The year 1998 is the 2nd year in the history of the Pride Fighting Championships, a mixed martial arts promotion based in Japan. 1998 had 3 events beginning with, Pride 2.

Debut Pride FC fighters

The following fighters fought their first Pride FC fight in 1998:

 Alexander Otsuka
 Allan Goes
 Amir Rahnavardi
 Carlos Newton
 Daijiro Matsui
 Daiju Takase
 Emmanuel Yarborough
 George Randolph

 Hugo Duarte
 Igor Vovchanchyn
 Juan Mott
 Kazushi Sakuraba 
 Kyle Sturgeon
 Marco Ruas
 Mark Kerr
 Naoki Sano

 Pedro Otavio
 Royler Gracie
 Sanae Kikuta
 Satoshi Honma
 Tasis Petridis
 Vernon White
 Wallid Ismail
 William van Roosmalen

Events list

Pride 2

Pride 2 was an event held on March 15, 1998, at The Yokohama Arena in Yokohama, Japan.

Results

Pride 3

Pride 3 was an event held on June 24, 1998, at The Nippon Budokan in Tokyo, Japan.

Results

Pride 4

Pride 4 was an event held on October 11, 1998, at The Tokyo Dome in Tokyo, Japan.

Results

See also
 Pride Fighting Championships
 List of Pride Fighting Championships champions
 List of Pride Fighting events

References

Pride Fighting Championships events
1998 in mixed martial arts